Linda Bunaga (born 13 February 1987) is a Papua New Guinean footballer who plays as a goalkeeper. She has been a member of the Papua New Guinea women's national team.

Notes

References

1987 births
Living people
Papua New Guinean women's footballers
Women's association football goalkeepers
Papua New Guinea women's international footballers